The AIA Guide to New York City by Norval White, Elliot Willensky, and Fran Leadon is an extensive catalogue with descriptions, critique and photographs of significant and noteworthy architecture throughout the five boroughs of New York City. Originally published in 1967, the fifth edition, with new co-author Fran Leadon, was published in 2010.

See also 
 American Institute of Architects
 Architecture of New York City

References 
Notes

External links
Fifth edition on Google Books
Fourth edition on Google Books

Architecture books
Architecture in New York City
City guides
Books about New York City